The 1936 United States Senate elections coincided with the reelection of President Franklin D. Roosevelt. The 32 seats of Class 2 were contested in regular elections, and special elections were held to fill vacancies. The Great Depression continued and voters backed progressive candidates favoring Roosevelt's New Deal in races across the country. The Democrats gained 5 net seats during the election, and in combination with Democratic and Farmer–Labor interim appointments and the defection of George W. Norris from the Republican Party to become independent, the Republicans were reduced to 16 seats. The Democrats' 75 seats and their 59-seat majority remain their largest in history. 

This was the last of four consecutive elections where Republicans suffered losses due to the ongoing effects of the Great Depression. This was also the last Senate election until 2012 in which a Democratic candidate who won two terms also made net gains in the Senate on both occasions (although Franklin Roosevelt won a third and fourth term, he lost Senate seats on both occasions). This is the last time any party held 3/4ths of all Senate seats.

Gains, losses, and holds

Retirements
One Republican, one Farmer-Labor, and five Democrats retired instead of seeking re-election.

Defeats
Six Republicans and one Democrat sought re-election but lost in the primary or general election.

Death
One Democrat died on July 16th, 1936 and his seat remained vacant until the election.

Party Switches
One Republican won re-election as an Independent.

Change in composition

Before the elections 
After the April 1936 special election.

Result of the elections

Beginning of the next Congress

Race summaries

Elections during the 74th Congress 
In these special elections the winners were seated once they qualified; ordered by election date.

Elections leading to the 75th Congress 
In these general elections, the winners were elected for the term beginning January 3, 1937; ordered by state.

All of the elections involved the Class 2 seats.

Closest races 
Eleven races had a margin of victory under 10%:

There is no tipping point state.

Alabama

Arkansas

Colorado

Delaware

Florida (special) 
There were two special elections in Florida, due to the May 8, 1936 death of four-term Democrat Park Trammell and the June 17, 1936 death of five-term Democrat Duncan U. Fletcher.

Florida (special, class 1) 

Democrat Scott M. Loftin was appointed May 26, 1936 to continue the term, pending a special election.  Primaries were held August 11, 1936.

Andrews would be re-elected once and serve until his death September 18, 1946.

Florida (special, class 3) 

Democrat William Luther Hill was appointed July 1, 1936 to continue the term, pending a special election.  Democrat Claude Pepper, who had lost to Trammell in 1934 won this election.

Pepper would be re-elected twice and serve until he lost renomination in 1950.  He would later be elected to the U.S. House of Representatives and serve there for 26 years.

Georgia

Idaho

Illinois

Iowa

Kansas

Kentucky

Louisiana

Louisiana (regular)

Louisiana (special) 

Democrat Rose McConnell Long was elected April 21, 1936 to finish the term to which she was appointed on January 31, 1936.  She was not a candidate, however, to the next term on November 3, 1936, see above.

Maine

Massachusetts

Michigan

Minnesota 

There were 2 elections to the same seat on the same day due to the December 22, 1935 death of two-term Republican Thomas D. Schall.

Minnesota (special) 

The election was held to fill the vacancy in the seat formerly held by Thomas D. Schall for the final two months of Schall's unexpired term. Governor Floyd B. Olson had appointed Elmer Benson to fill the seat in 1935, but this appointment was temporary and subject to a special election held in the next general election year thereafter—1936. Benson opted to run for governor instead of running for election to continue for the remainder of the term. No special primaries were held for the special election, and, among Minnesota's three major parties, only the Republican Party of Minnesota officially fielded a candidate—Guy V. Howard. Regardless of the absence of Farmer-Labor and Democratic nominees, Howard nevertheless faced a great degree of competition from independent candidates Nathaniel J. Holmberg, Andrew Olaf Devold, and John G. Alexander.

The candidates were:
 John G. Alexander (I), Attorney and real estate manager
 Andrew Olaf Devold (I), Attorney, State Senator since 1919, former State Representative (1915-1919); a member of the Farmer-Labor Party of Minnesota and formerly a member of the Socialist Party of Minnesota
 N. J. Holmberg (I), Former State Senator (1915-1919) and State Representative (1907-1915); a member of the Republican Party of Minnesota
 Guy V. Howard (R), Businessman and Republican elector in the 1916 presidential election

Howard was not a candidate for the next term, and served only until January 1937.

Minnesota (regular) 

The election to the next term was won by Farmer–Labor congressman Ernest Lundeen.

Mississippi

Montana

Nebraska

New Hampshire

New Jersey

New Mexico 

There were 2 elections, due to the May 6, 1935 death of two-term Republican Bronson M. Cutting.

New Mexico (special) 

Democratic former-Congressman Dennis Chavez had been Cutting's opponent in 1934. On May 11, 1935, after Cutting's death, Chavez was then appointed to continue Cutting's term, pending a special election which he then won.

Chavez would be re-elected four more times and serve until his death in 1962.

New Mexico (regular) 

One-term Democrat Carl Hatch was easily re-elected.

Hatch would be re-elected once and serve until his 1948 retirement.

North Carolina

Oklahoma

Oregon

Rhode Island

South Carolina 

|-
| bgcolor="#FF3333" |
| Republican 
| Joseph Augustis Tolbert
| align="right" | 961
| align="right" | 0.8
| align="right" | N/A
|-
| bgcolor="#FF3333" |
| Republican 
| Marion W. Seabrook
| align="right" | 702
| align="right" | 0.6
| align="right" | N/A
|-

|-
| 
| colspan=5 |Democratic hold
|-

South Dakota

Tennessee

Texas

Virginia

West Virginia

Wyoming

See also 
 1936 United States elections
 1936 United States presidential election
 1936 United States House of Representatives elections
 74th United States Congress
 75th United States Congress

Notes

References